Tough Love are a British duo consisting of Alex and Stefan. They are best known for their debut single "So Freakin' Tight", which peaked to number 11 on the UK Singles Chart. The duo were previously signed to Island Records through their own imprint Get Twisted Records.

Career
Tough Love formed in 2011, and had created a cult following of hardcore dance music fans across the UK. Favourites across national radio stations including BBC Radio 1, 1xtra, Kiss, Kiss Fresh, Capital, Capital Xtra and Rinse FM, Tough Love earned support from broadcasters and DJs Annie Mac, Pete Tong, B Traits, Mark Fowler, Mad Alan, Danny Howard, MistaJam, Target as well as gaining industry respect from DJs such as Duke Dumont, Solomun, Kenny Dope, Todd Terry and Roger Sanchez.

They were labeled by Annie Mac on BBC Radio 1 as "one of the production teams we're excited for" and dubbed as "an act you need to look out for" by BBC Radio 1's Danny Howard. The duo have released on a series of established international labels, including Toolroom, Off, Nurvous, Suara and Kenny Dope's Dope Wax as well as their own imprint Get Twisted Records. They also won 'Best Single' at the 2014 Bass Music Awards for "Lonely Highway".

Tough Love provided remixes for Le Youth's "Real" and "Dance with Me", Clean Bandit & Jess Glynne's "Real Love" and "Aint Got Far to Go", Meghan Trainor's "All About That Bass" and Shift K3Y's "I Know".

In 2015, the duo scored two Top 40 hits with "So Freakin' Tight" (#11) and "Pony (Jump on It)" (#39) as well as cementing their underground prowess with a weekly residency for 'The Redlight' at Sankeys Ibiza alongside DJ EZ, Todd Terry and Matt Jam Lamont. They compiled and mixed The Redlight 2015 album which was released on Get Twisted Records charting in the national compilation chart. In the summer of 2015, Tough Love announced a joint venture deal between Get Twisted Records and Sony Columbia.

Radio
Tough Love currently hold weekly radio shows on Kiss FM every Thursday at midnight and Kiss Fresh Fridays from 9 pm, showcasing their signature sound 'The Best of Big & Bumpy Basslines'. They also host a syndicated radio show called "Get Twisted" which is also available as a podcast.

Discography

Studio albums

Extended plays

Singles

Remix credits 
 Craig David – Change My Love (Insanity / Sony)
 Chase & Status – All Goes Wrong (Mercury)
 Todd Terry – Cold Shoulder (Get Twisted / Sony)
 Sigala – Give Me Your Love Feat John Newman & Nile Rogers (MOS)
 X Ambassadors – "Unsteady" (Interscope)
 Jess Glynne – "Aint Got Far To Go" (Atlantic Records)
 Smokin Beats – "Dreams" (Hot Source / Circus)
 Marlon Roudette – "Erupting" (Syco / Sony)
 Alexa Goddard – "We Broke The Sky" (Roc Nation)
 Le Youth – "Real" (Epic Records)
 Clean Bandit & Jess Glynne – "Real Love" (Atlantic Records)
 Meghan Trainor – "All About That Bass" (Epic Records)
 Borgeous – "Invincible" (Spinnin Records / Champion Records)
 Shift K3Y – "I Know" (Columbia  / Sony)
 Donae'o and Carnao Beats – "Gone in the Morning"
 Le Youth – "Dance With Me" (Epic Records)
 Jaguar Skills – "Hamburger"
 Doorly – "Rush" (Toolroom)
 Ruby Goe – "Badman"
Jamiroquai - "Cloud 9" (Virgin Emi)
Katy Perry - "Smile" (Capitol Records)

EPs
 "Friday Night" (Get Twisted)
 "DLNW" (Undr The Radr)
 "What You Need Is Me" Feat Nastaly (Get Twisted / Sony)
 Closed the Door featuring Nastaly (LouLou Records)
 Amine Edge & Dance VS Tough Love – The Perfect Love (Get Twisted Records)
 Dreams (Toolroom Records)
 Bring the Heat Volume 1 (Get Twisted Records)
 Loving You / Hating Me (Get Twisted Records)
 Tough Love & Taylor – In My Way (Off Recordings)
 Keep It Burning (Nervous Records)
 The Night Is Calling (Runnin' Wild Records)
 You've Been Cheating
 Taking Over
 Cold Blood

Awards
 Bass House Music Awards "Best Single 2014" – winner
 DJ Mag "Best British Newcomer" – nominated

References

External Link
 

Musical groups established in 2011
English house music duos
2011 establishments in the United Kingdom